Morris Rajapaksa (b. - d. 1995) was the 3rd Chief Minister of Western Province. He was appointed on 22 August 1994 succeeding Chandrika Kumaratunga, after she was elected as Prime Minister of Sri Lanka. Rajapaska served as Chief Minister until his death on 11 July 1995. He was succeeded by Susil Premajayanth.

Rajapaksa was an Attorney-at-Law, a member of the Bar Council and was the Treasurer and Vice President of the Colombo Magistrate Courts Lawyer's Association.

References

Chief Ministers of Western Province, Sri Lanka
1995 deaths
Sri Lanka Freedom Party politicians
20th-century Sri Lankan lawyers